Reinhold Frosch (9 April 1935 – 14 February 2012) was an Austrian luger who competed from the mid-1950s to the early 1960s. He won a complete set of medals at the FIL World Luge Championships with a gold in the men's doubles (1960), a silver in the men's singles event (1960), and a bronze in the men's singles event (1958).

Frosch also won a bronze medal in the men's doubles event at the 1962 FIL European Luge Championships in Weissenbach, Austria.

References

List of European luge champions 
Reinhold Frosch's obituary 

1935 births
2012 deaths
Austrian male lugers